Leslie Gilbert Dwyer (28 August 1906 – 26 December 1986) was an English film and television actor.

Career
He was born in Catford, the son of the popular music hall comedian Johnny Dwyer, and acted from the age of ten and appeared in his first film in 1921. He is perhaps best known for his role as the Punch and Judy man Mr Partridge in BBC sitcom Hi-de-Hi!. Film roles included In Which We Serve (1942), The Way Ahead (1944), the 1952 remake of Hindle Wakes, Act of Love (1953) in which he played a two hander scene opposite the young Brigitte Bardot, Room in the House (1955), the 1959 remake of Hitchcock's The 39 Steps, and Die, Monster, Die! (1966).

He played Sergeant Dusty Miller in the original 1942 production of Terence Rattigan's play Flare Path.

He played Drinkwater in the 1953 television production of George Bernard Shaw's 'Captain Brassbound's Conversion'. His most notable television role was as Mr Partridge, the miserable, hard-drinking Punch and Judy man with an aversion to children, in the British sitcom Hi-de-Hi!. He took roles in Public Eye in 1969, Doctor Who (as Vorg in Carnival of Monsters in 1973) and in Steptoe and Son, Terry and June, Wodehouse Playhouse, Z-Cars and The Sweeney, in which he played "old sea dog" Ted Greenhead in the episode Trojan Bus.

Death
Dwyer died on 26 December 1986, aged 80 (respiratory failure due to pulmonary embolism).  His grave is located in the East London Cemetery.

Selected filmography

 Cheer Up (1936) - Hotel Guest (uncredited)
 In Which We Serve (1942) -  Parkinson 
 The Goose Steps Out (1942) - German Soldier on Train (uncredited)
 Schweik's New Adventures (1943) - Prisoner
 Yellow Canary (1943) - Ship's Steward (uncredited)
 The Lamp Still Burns (1943) - Siddons
 The Way Ahead (1944) - Pte. Sid Beck
 Great Day (1945) - Pub Customer
 Perfect Strangers (1945) - Stripey
 Night Boat to Dublin (1946) - George Leggett
 I See a Dark Stranger (1946) - Soldier in Cafe (uncredited)
 This Man Is Mine (1946) - Van Driver (uncredited)
 Piccadilly Incident (1946) - Sam
 Temptation Harbour (1947) - Reg
 The Little Ballerina (1947) - Barman
 When the Bough Breaks (1947) - George
 The Calendar (1948) - Sam Hillcott
 Bond Street (1948) - Barman
 The Bad Lord Byron (1949) - Fletcher
 It's Not Cricket (1949) - Batman
 A Boy, a Girl and a Bike (1949) - Steve Hall
 Now Barabbas (1949) - Brown
 Poet's Pub (1949) - Holly
 Double Confession (1950) - Leonard
 Lilli Marlene (1950) - Berry
 Midnight Episode (1950) - Albert
 Smart Alec (1951) - Gossage
 Laughter in Paradise (1951) - Police Sergeant
 There Is Another Sun (1951) - Foley
 Judgment Deferred (1952) - Flowers
 The Hour of 13 (1952) - Ernie Perker
 My Wife's Lodger (1952) - Roger the Lodger
 Hindle Wakes (1952) - Chris Hawthorn
 Marilyn (1953) - George Saunders
 Act of Love (1953) - Le sergent anglais
 The Good Die Young (1954) - Stookey
 The Black Rider (1954) - Robert Plack
 Where There's a Will (1955) - Alfie Brewer
 Room in the House (1955) - Benji Pugh
 Not So Dusty (1956) - Nobby
 Cloak Without Dagger (1956) - Fred Borcombe
 Eyewitness (1956) - Henry Cammon
 Face in the Night (1957) - Toby
 Stormy Crossing (1958) - Bill Harris
 The 39 Steps (1959) - Milkman
 Left Right and Centre (1959) - Left - Alf Stoker
 Seventy Deadly Pills (1964) - Police Constable Robinson
 I've Gotta Horse (1965) - Bert
 Die, Monster, Die! (1965) (UK title: Monster of Terror) - Potter
 The Bliss of Mrs. Blossom (1968) - Bookshop assistant
 Lionheart (1968) - Carpenter
 Crooks and Coronets (1969) - Henry
 Up in the Air (1969) - Driver
 Dominique (1978) - Cemetery Supervisor

References

External links

 

1906 births
1986 deaths
People from Catford
English male film actors
English male television actors
20th-century English male actors
Male actors from London
English male stage actors
Male actors from Kent